is a series of mahjong video games that have been developed and released by Jaleco on a variety of platforms including arcade, PC, and video game consoles. The first game in the series was on the Super Famicom in 1993 as Bishōjo Janshi Suchie-Pai and was renamed Idol Janshi Suchie-Pai for its subsequent releases. Kenichi Sonoda did the character designs. There is also an anime OVA that is based on the game.

Games

References

External links
 Official Suchie-Pai series website
 Idol Janshi Suchie-Pai Museum
 

1993 video games
3DO Interactive Multiplayer games
Anime OVAs
Anime series
OVAs based on video games
Arcade video games
Bishōjo games
City Connection franchises
Mahjong video games
Dreamcast games
Jaleco games
Japan-exclusive video games
Mobile games
Nintendo DS games
PlayStation (console) games
PlayStation 2 games
PlayStation Portable games
Sega Saturn games
Super Nintendo Entertainment System games
Video game franchises
Video games developed in Japan
Virtual Console games